Giacomo Nicotera (born 15 July 1996) is an Italian professional rugby union player who primarily plays hooker for Benetton of the United Rugby Championship.

Club career 
Nicotera has previously played for clubs such as Mogliano, San Donà, and Rovigo in the past. Under contract with Top10 side Rovigo Delta, he was named as a Permit Player for Benetton in the 2020–21 Pro14 and 2021–22 United Rugby Championship seasons. He made his Benetton debut in the rearranged Round 4 match of the 2020–21 Pro14 against Connacht.

International career 
On the 14 October 2021, Nicotera was selected by Alessandro Troncon to be part of an Italy A 28-man squad for the 2021 end-of-year rugby union internationals.
On the 13 January 2022, he was selected by Kieran Crowley to be part of an Italy 33-man squad for the 2022 Six Nations Championship. He made his debut against Scotland.

References

External links 

1996 births
Living people
Italian rugby union players
Benetton Rugby players
Rugby union hookers
Mogliano Rugby players
Rugby Rovigo Delta players
Italy international rugby union players
Sportspeople from Trieste